Byron Bertram (born 29 October 1952), is a former professional tennis player from South Africa

Bertram attended Parktown Boys' High School. During his career he won 1 tour doubles title and achieved a career-high singles ranking of world No. 51 in July 1976. Bertram reached the quarterfinals of the 1977 Wimbledon Championships; defeated Stan Smith at the tournament in 1975; and was a member of the winning South Africa Davis Cup team in 1974.

Career finals

Doubles (1 title, 3 runner-ups)

Singles (1 runner-up)

External links
 
 

Tennis players from Johannesburg
South African male tennis players
South African people of British descent
White South African people
Wimbledon junior champions
1952 births
Living people
Alumni of Parktown Boys' High School
Grand Slam (tennis) champions in boys' singles